The Reading Red Sox were a minor league baseball affiliate of the Boston Red Sox baseball franchise.

History
The team was based in Reading, Pennsylvania, and played in the Class A New York–Pennsylvania League (1933–1934) and its successor league, the Double-A Eastern League (1963–1964). During the latter period, the manager was Eddie Popowski and the team featured such star players as veteran former Red Sox slugger Dick Gernert, a Reading native, and prospects Mike Andrews, Joe Foy, Tony Horton, Mike Ryan, Rico Petrocelli and Reggie Smith.

In 1965, Boston moved its AA affiliate to Pittsfield, Massachusetts, and the Cleveland Indians re-established a farm club in Reading, where the Indians had a successful affiliate from 1950 to 1961. Since 1967, the Philadelphia Phillies have based their Double-A affiliate in the city (named the Reading Fightin Phils ); it led the Eastern League in attendance in 2006.

Notable players
 See :Category:Reading Red Sox players

References

External links
 1933 team photo at goreadingberks.com

 

Defunct New York–Penn League teams
Defunct Eastern League (1938–present) teams
Defunct baseball teams in Pennsylvania
Boston Red Sox minor league affiliates
Reading, Pennsylvania
1933 establishments in Pennsylvania
1964 disestablishments in Pennsylvania
Baseball teams established in 1933
Baseball teams disestablished in 1964